Kiril Dimitrov may refer to:

 Kiril Dimitrov (wrestler), Bulgarian wrestler
 Kiril Dimitrov (footballer), Bulgarian footballer